CNBC (formerly Consumer News and Business Channel) is an American basic cable business news channel and website. It provides business news programming on weekdays from 5:00 a.m. to 7:00 p.m., Eastern Time, while broadcasting talk shows, investigative reports, documentaries, infomercials, reality shows, and other programs at all other times. Along with Fox Business and Bloomberg Television, it is one of the three major business news channels. It also operates a website and mobile apps, whereby users can watch the channel via streaming media, and which provide some content that is only accessible to paid subscribers. CNBC content is available on demand on smart speakers including Amazon Echo devices with Amazon Alexa, Google Home and app devices with Google Assistant, and on Apple Siri voice interfaces including iPhones. Many CNBC TV shows are available as podcasts for on-demand listening. Graphics are designed by Sweden-based Magoo 3D studios.

CNBC is a division of NBCUniversal News Group, a subsidiary of NBCUniversal, which is owned by Comcast. It is headquartered in Englewood Cliffs, New Jersey.

In addition to the domestic U.S. feed, there are several international editions on the list of CNBC channels, although many just license the CNBC name. Examples include CNBC World, CNBC Europe, CNBC Asia, Class CNBC in Italy, CNBC Indonesia in Indonesia, CNBC Arabiya in the UAE, Nikkei CNBC in Japan, CNBC TV18, CNBC Awaaz, and CNBC Baazar (A special Gujarati language channel) in India, and GNN/CNBC Pakistan in Pakistan.

History
CNBC traces its roots to the founding in 1979 of the Satellite Program Network (SPN), showing a low-budget mix of old movies and instructional and entertainment programs. The channel later changed its name to Tempo Television. After initially signing a letter of intent to acquire Tempo, NBC opted for a deal to lease the channel's transponder in June 1988. On this platform, and under the guidance of Tom Rogers, the channel was relaunched on April 17, 1989, as the Consumer News and Business Channel. NBC and Cablevision initially operated CNBC as a 50–50 joint venture, and it was headquartered in Fort Lee, New Jersey. Sue Herera and Scott Cohn joined CNBC at its inception.

CNBC had considerable difficulty getting cable carriage at first, as many providers were skeptical of placing it alongside the longer-established Financial News Network. By the winter of 1990, CNBC was in only 17 million homes – less than half of FNN's potential reach – despite the size of NBC, its parent.

After an accounting scandal, FNN filed for bankruptcy protection on March 2, 1991 and put itself up for sale. After a bidding war with a Dow Jones & Company–Westinghouse Broadcasting consortium, CNBC was awarded FNN by a bankruptcy judge for $154.3 million on May 21, 1991 and merged the two operations. CNBC hired around 60 of FNN's 300-person workforce. Bill Griffeth and Joe Kernen, who are still with the channel, joined CNBC at that time. Other former FNN's workforce were hired by Bloomberg Television. The deal increased the distribution of the network to over 40 million homes. Cablevision sold its 49.5% stake in CNBC to NBC upon completion of the deal.

Roger Ailes was hired as the president of CNBC in August 1993, tasked by NBC CEO Bob Wright with turning around the struggling network. Ailes resigned in January 1996 due to disagreements with management including the decision by NBC management to form a joint venture with Microsoft that included the rebrand of "America's Talking" as MSNBC. Under the leadership of Ailes, annual revenue at CNBC rose from $43 million to $110 million.

CNBC launched CNBC Asia, headquartered in Singapore in June 1995 and CNBC Europe, headquartered in London, in March 1996.

In December 1997, CNBC formed a strategic alliance with Dow Jones, including content sharing with Dow Jones Newswires, The Wall Street Journal, MarketWatch, and Barron's and the rebranding of the channel as "a service of NBC and Dow Jones" (later "a service of NBC Universal and Dow Jones" following the formation of NBCUniversal in 2004). Fox merged with Dow Jones in 2007 and Fox Business later became a competitor to CNBC.

Also in December 1997, CNBC's international channels were merged into a 50-50 joint venture with their Dow Jones-owned rivals, London-based European Business News and Singapore-based Asia Business News.

During the late 1990s and early 2000s, CNBC's ratings increased sharply along with the stock market, often beating those of CNN during market hours. The highest daytime viewership of the network in 2000 was 343,000.

However, after the burst of the dot-com bubble, CNBC's viewing figures declined in tandem. In 2002, CNBC's ratings fell 44% and were down another 5% in 2003. The network's ratings steadily fell until bottoming in Q1 2005, with an average viewership of 134,000 during the day.

From 2001 to 2006, the CNBC website was operated by MSN.

In August 2003, CNBC signed a deal to provide weather content from AccuWeather.

In October 2003, CNBC moved its world headquarters from Fort Lee (the old facility then became occupied by WNJU-TV, then recently acquired by NBC) to a new digital video production studio in Englewood Cliffs, New Jersey.

NBC Universal reacquired full control of loss-making CNBC Europe and CNBC Asia from Dow Jones at the end of 2005. The licensing agreement between Dow and CNBC U.S. remained intact, until it expired in 2012.

CNBC reported annual revenues of $510 million in 2006.

In September 2006, CNBC launched the FTSE CNBC Global 300 stock market index in conjunction with FTSE Group. The index includes the fifteen largest companies from each of the sectors of the Industry Classification Benchmark as well as the thirty largest companies from emerging markets.

Profits at CNBC exceeded $333 million in 2007, making CNBC the second most profitable of NBC Universal's thirteen cable channels in the United States, behind only the USA Network. Ratings hit an all-time high in 2007.

CNBC Africa was launched on June 1, 2007.

On October 22, 2007, CNBC launched "CNBC Investor Network", a series of webcam connections to the trading rooms of various independent financial institutions across the United States, allowing traders to be interviewed instantaneously as news breaks.

In December 2007, CNBC formed a content partnership with Yahoo! Finance.

In January 2008, CNBC formed a content partnership with The New York Times, which was seen as an attempt by both parties to take on increased competition from News Corporation.

In May 2008, CNBC formed a content partnership with AOL.

Average daytime viewership (6:00 a.m. to 6:00 p.m.) reached a seven-year high of 310,000 viewers in the first quarter of 2008.

Ratings plummeted in 2009 as the network aired bad economic news resulting from the Great Recession.

In January 2010, the launch of the Korean language channel SBS-CNBC marked the fifteenth CNBC-branded channel worldwide.

In July 2010, BT signed a five-year contract with CNBC Europe to distribute content from its London headquarters to sister sites in Europe and the US.

In 2011, CNBC won an award at the International Broadcasting Convention for its CNBC 4D: Interactive motion tracking that allows CNBC presenters to interact with 3D graphics, using technology from Unreel, Brainstorm, Motion Analysis.

In June 2012, CNBC expanded its partnership with Yahoo! Finance in an effort to reach more online viewers. That month, CNBC.com had 6.5 million unique visitors in the United States while Yahoo! Finance had 37.5 million.

In 2013, host Maria Bartiromo left CNBC for Fox Business in part because Fox offered her $5–6 million per year compared to the $4 million per year that she made at CNBC.

On January 6, 2015, CNBC changed the way it calculates ratings, switching from Nielsen ratings to a system by Cogent Research to calculate the viewership of its business day programming by surveying financial advisers and investors, with the goal of providing a more accurate measurement of the network's out-of-home viewership; Nielsen is still used to track the viewership of its entertainment programming.

In October 2015, CNBC reached a record in viewership when it hosted one of the United States presidential debates of the Republican Party.

On January 10, 2016, CNBC and Trans Media announced a strategic partnership to create Indonesian language channel CNBC Indonesia. The channel was launched in 2018.

By 2017, Fox Business had overtaken CNBC as the most watched daytime business news network.

CNBC’s online video operations generated an all-time high of 1.92 billion total digital video starts across platforms in 2020.

In 2020, CNBC hired Shepard Smith from Fox News to be its primary news anchor, providing a salary of approximately $10 million. However, viewers did not follow him from Fox.

In 2021, CNBC signed a new multi-platform deal with Jim Cramer.

In 2021, CNBC moved their Singapore HQ to Mapletree Business City

Physical stores

CNBC has a licensing partnership with Paradies Lagardère to operate retail locations in United States airports branded as CNBC News, CNBC Express, and CNBC SmartShop. The stores sell CNBC-branded merchandise as well as snacks and drinks.

Criticism
CNBC has been criticized for allegedly amplifying bull and bear markets, particularly in the run-up to the dot-com bubble and the subprime mortgage crisis a decade later. In response to these criticisms, CNBC anchors have pointed to the size of the market and noted that influencing it is "a little out of our reach."

Jon Stewart on Comedy Central's The Daily Show has been a vocal critic of CNBC and some of its personalities, beginning after comments were made by Rick Santelli. Despite the lack of direct comments by the network, several personalities have defended their predictions and comments.

CNBC was accused by the Obama administration of "cable chatter"—the excessive and sometimes brutal discussion on a particular topic, often one-sided.

Performance of Jim Cramer's stock picks
Regarding CNBC's Mad Money host Jim Cramer, an August 20, 2007 article in Barron's stated that "his picks haven't beaten the market. Over the past two years, viewers holding Cramer's stocks would be up 12% while the Dow rose 22% and the S&P 500 16%."

High definition 
On October 10, 2007, CNBC HD, a 1080i high-definition television simulcast of CNBC, was launched, first on DirecTV.

On October 13, 2014, coincidentally the 11th anniversary of CNBC's relocation to its current facilities in Englewood Cliffs, NJ, CNBC switched to a full 16:9 letterbox presentation, in line with CNBC Asia and CNBC Europe.

Gallery

Programming 
Current notable programming (as of March 2023)
 Closing Bell: Scott Wapner
 Closing Bell Overtime: Morgan Brennan, Jon Fortt
 Fast Money: Melissa Lee (host), Guy Adami, Tim Seymour, and Karen Finerman (panelists)
 Fast Money Halftime Report: Scott Wapner
 Last Call:  Brian Sullivan
 Mad Money: hosted by money manager Jim Cramer, is an hour-long show that gives stock advice to viewers who call to the program. The show also has a popular segment called "The Lightning Round". In August 2007, Cramer's on-air tirade about the weakening economy, which was seen during the "Stop Trading" segment on Street Signs, received national attention.
 Power Lunch: Kelly Evans and Tyler Mathisen
 Squawk Box: Joe Kernen, Rebecca Quick, and Andrew Ross Sorkin
 Squawk on the Street: Carl Quintanilla, David Faber, Sara Eisen, and Jim Cramer
 Street Signs: Joumanna Bercetche and Julianna Tatelbaum (produced by CNBC Europe)
 The Exchange: Kelly Evans
 Worldwide Exchange: Frank Holland

Non-business-programming, including Reality television 
 American Greed
 Blue Collar Millionaires
 Business Nation, anchored by award-winning journalist David Faber. Each edition of the program covers three stories; a mixture of profiles, investigative pieces and features. The format of the show is structured similarly to HBO's Real Sports.
 Cleveland Hustles
 CNBC on Assignment (for example, The Age of Wal-Mart)
 Cover to Cover
 Jay Leno's Garage
 On the Money
 Restaurant Startup

 Secret Lives of the Super Rich
 Staten Island Hustle, a revival of former NBC game show Deal or No Deal
 The Car Chasers
 The News with Shepard Smith - described as being "non-partisan" and "fact-based".
 The Partner
 The Profit
 The Suze Orman Show
 Trash Inc: The Secret Life of Garbage (2010)
 Treasure Detectives
 West Texas Investors Club

Notable former programming

Weekly, weekend and other programming
 American Le Mans Series races (inaugural 1999 season only, as part of agreement with NBC Sports)
 Champions Tour golf (moved to Golf Channel)
 CNET
 DLife: Your Diabetes Show (2005-2013, using weekend paid programming time)
 Louis Rukeyser's Wall Street (ended its run on December 31, 2004 at Louis Rukeyser's request due to illness)
 Market Watch
 Market Week with Maria Bartiromo (renamed After Hours with Maria Bartiromo and then Special Report with Maria Bartiromo—cancelled in 2004)
 National Geographic Explorer (moved to MSNBC and then to the National Geographic Channel)
 Nightly Business Report, a 30-minute weeknight business newscast hosted by Sue Herera and Bill Griffeth and distributed to U.S. public television stations. Launched in 1979, CNBC assumed production of the series in 2013 and ended production in December 2019.
 Real Personal
 Squawk Alley
 TechCheck
 The Big Idea with Donny Deutsch
 The Charles Grodin Show (moved to MSNBC in 1998)
 The Dick Cavett Show
 The McLaughlin Group
 The Suze Orman Show
 Tim Russert 
 Tom Snyder
 Topic [A] with Tina Brown
 Ushuaia
 Weekend Squawk Box

Non-business programming
 1 vs. 100
 Deal or No Deal
 Dennis Miller
 Late Night with Conan O'Brien
 The Apprentice
 The Apprentice: Martha Stewart

See also

 CNBC Ticker
 List of CNBC personalities
 NBC Sports on CNBC

References

External links

CNBC original programming
 
24-hour television news channels in the United States
Business-related television channels
CNBC global channels
Companies based in Bergen County, New Jersey
Englewood Cliffs, New Jersey
English-language television stations in the United States
Former General Electric subsidiaries
NBCUniversal networks
Peabody Award winners
Sirius XM Radio channels
Television channels and stations established in 1989
Television stations in New Jersey
U.S. Route 9W